Banli Township may refer to:

 Banli Township, Fujian (坂里乡), in Changtai County
 Banli Township, Guangxi (板利乡), in Jiangzhou District, Chongzuo